is a motorsport racing complex located in Nihonmatsu, Fukushima Prefecture, Japan.

Overview 
The Ebisu Circuit complex has seven individual tracks and two skid pad type circuits. The circuits are Nishi (West), Kita (North), Higashi (East), Minami (South) as well as Drift Land, the School Course, The Touge (mountain pass) and 'KuruKuru Land' which are the skidpads. The most famous circuit is the Minami or South course which is used for D1 Grand Prix and other drifting events. The Higashi or East circuit features a 420-meter-long main straight with 20 ground-floor pit garages and is used mainly for grip events.

Ebisu Circuit was designed and built by the drift driver Nobushige Kumakubo and is one of the premier drifting-based race tracks in the world. Nobushige also holds other non-drifting motorsport events at Ebisu including motorcycle races, karting, endurance races, FJ1600 open-wheel car races and, in previous years, events like "Big-X". The complex also has a safari park.

In February 2021, the circuit suffered significant damage due to a landslide caused by the 2021 Fukushima earthquake.

References

External links
Official web site 

Motorsport venues in Japan
Sports venues in Fukushima Prefecture
Nihonmatsu, Fukushima
Sports venues completed in 1986
1986 establishments in Japan